Abu Bakr, known as Bata Mande Bori in oral tradition, was the fifth mansa of the Mali Empire, reigning during the late 13th century. He was a son of a daughter of Sunjata, the founder of the Mali Empire, and may have been adopted by Sunjata as a son. Abu Bakr succeeded Khalifa, a tyrant who was deposed after a brief reign. Abu Bakr was the first mansa of the Mali Empire to succeed through the female line. It remains debated whether Abu Bakr's succession marked a return to a traditional pattern of succession that had been ignored by his predecessors or if it was a break from traditional succession caused by political instability. After an unremarkable reign, Abu Bakr was succeeded by Sakura, an enslaved court official who seized power in a coup.

Identity
The identities of the two figures named Abu Bakr mentioned in Ibn Khaldun's history of the Mali Empire and the figures in oral tradition named Mande Bori and Bata Mande Bori have been subject to some confusion. According to oral tradition, Sunjata had a brother named Mande Bori. Some traditions also claim he had a son named Bata Mande Bori, though this son is not mentioned in all traditions. The word "Bata" suggests that Bata Mande Bori was not a biological son of Sunjata and was rather related to him through the female line, though he may have been adopted by Sunjata. Ibn Khaldun mentions two figures named Abu Bakr: the first is a son of Sunjata's daughter who reigned as mansa between Khalifa and Sakura and the second is a brother of Sunjata who was the ancestor of Mansa Musa.

The confusion arose from a mistranslation by the 19th-century historian Baron de Slane. De Slane interpreted the second Abu Bakr as being a son of Sunjata's sister and believed he reigned as mansa between Muhammad and Musa. In 1959, Djibril Tamsir Niane identified Mande Bori with the first Abu Bakr and Bata Mande Bori with the second Abu Bakr. The confusion was resolved in 1963 by Nehemia Levtzion, who studied the original manuscripts and realized a mistranslation had been made. The first Abu Bakr, who reigned between Khalifa and Sakura, was a son of Sunjata's daughter and should be identified with Bata Mande Bori. The second Abu Bakr, who did not reign as mansa and is only mentioned by Ibn Khaldun as the progenitor of Musa's lineage, was Sunjata's brother and should be identified with Mande Bori.

As De Slane's misinterpretation led to the belief that a figure named Abu Bakr was Musa's immediate predecessor, the name Abu Bakr II became associated with Musa's statement that his predecessor launched two expeditions to explore the Atlantic Ocean. Musa's predecessor, and thus the likely subject of the anecdote, was actually Muhammad ibn Qu.

See also
Mali Empire
Keita Dynasty

Footnotes

References

Year of birth unknown
1285 deaths
People of the Mali Empire
Mansas of Mali
13th-century monarchs in Africa
Keita family